The Mainz Workers' and Soldiers' Council was the effective government of Mainz from 9 November until the arrival of French troops on 9 December 1918 during the German Revolution of 1918.

Reports of the Kiel Mutiny are published in the Mainzer Zeitung on Thursday 7 November. The next day 50 armed revolutionary sailors arrive Kiel who immediately seize control of the railway station. They following day they proceed to the prison to release the prisoners. The starving population starts seizing food particularly from the military depot.

However the local Majority Social Democratic Party of Germany (MSPD) are anxious that their power will be eroded between the prospects of a conservative counter-revolution and a soviet style revolution. Under the leadership of Bernhard Adelung, a local MSPD politician, they convene a private meeting of representatives of the MSPD, the trade unions and the military in the "Schöffenhof" restaurant. Here the Mainz Workers' and Soldiers' Council was formed with seven workers and seven soldiers from amongst their number. Bernhard Adelung was the chairman. On 12 November they sent a delegation to Ingelheim am Rhein who urged the inhabitants there to also form a Workers' and Soldiers' Council.

They quickly took action to prevent further development of the revolution and the Kiel sailors were obliged to return to Frankfurt. On the steps of the town hall on 10 November in Halleplatz Adelung declares a democratic republic. The following day the terms of the Armistice are agreed, including the occupation of the Rhineland. According to the terms, French troops will arrive in Mainz. Under Adelung's leadership a reformist administration ensured public order until the arrival of French troops on 9 December 1918.

References

Early Soviet republics
Former socialist republics
German Revolution of 1918–1919